The 1916 season was the fifth season for Santos Futebol Clube, a Brazilian football club, based in the Vila Belmiro bairro, Zona Intermediária, Santos, Brazil.

References

External links
Official Site 

Santos
1916
1916 in Brazilian football